1902 was the second year for the Detroit Tigers in the newly formed American League. The team finished in seventh place with a record of 58–77 (.385), 30½ games behind the Philadelphia Athletics. The 1902 Tigers were outscored by their opponents 657 runs to 566. The team's attendance at Bennett Park was 189,469, sixth out of the eight teams in the AL. Detroit's blue laws prevented the Tigers from playing baseball at Bennett Park on Sundays. As a result, the Tigers played their Sunday home games for the season at Burns Park; a stadium constructed by owner James D. Burns.

Regular season

Season standings

Record vs. opponents

Roster

Player stats

Batting

Starters by position 
Note: Pos = Position; G = Games played; AB = At bats; H = Hits; Avg. = Batting average; HR = Home runs; RBI = Runs batted in

Other batters 
Note: G = Games played; AB = At bats; H = Hits; Avg. = Batting average; HR = Home runs; RBI = Runs batted in

Note: pitchers' batting statistics not included

Pitching

Starting pitchers 
Note: G = Games pitched; IP = Innings pitched; W = Wins; L = Losses; ERA = Earned run average; SO = Strikeouts

Relief pitchers 
Note: G = Games pitched; W = Wins; L = Losses; SV = Saves; ERA = Earned run average; SO = Strikeouts

Awards and honors

League top five finishers 
 Jimmy Barrett: AL leader in putouts by an outfielder (326)
 Jimmy Barrett: #4 in AL in on-base percentage (.397)
 Jimmy Barrett: #3 in AL in bases on balls (74)
 Jimmy Barrett: #5 in AL in times on base (234)
 Fritz Buelow: AL leader in errors by a catcher (20)
 Kid Elberfeld: #2 in AL in times hit by pitch (11)
 Kid Gleason: AL leader in errors by a second baseman (42)
 Dick Harley: AL leader in times hit by pitch (12)
 Deacon McGuire: 5th oldest player in the AL (38)
 Win Mercer: #2 in AL in shutouts (4)
 Win Mercer: #3 in AL in losses (18)
 George Mullin: AL leader in wild pitches (13)
 George Mullin: #4 in AL in walks allowed (95)
 Ed Siever: AL leader in ERA (1.91)
 Ed Siever: AL leader in Adjusted ERA+ (196)
 Ed Siever: #4 in AL in walks plus hits per 9 innings pitched (WHIP) (1.051)
 Ed Siever: #4 in AL in hits allowed per 9 innings pitched (7.93)
 Ed Siever: #4 in AL in walks per 9 innings pitched (1.53)
 Ed Siever: #2 in AL in shutouts (4)

References 

 1902 Detroit Tigers Regular Season Statistics at Baseball Reference

Detroit Tigers seasons
Detroit Tigers season
Detroit Tigers
1902 in Detroit